Pabu is a commune in the Côtes-d'Armor department of Brittany in northwestern France.

Population

Inhabitants of Pabu are called pabuais in French.

Breton language
In 2008, 32.46% of primary school children attended bilingual schools.

See also
Communes of the Côtes-d'Armor department

References

External links

Official website 

Communes of Côtes-d'Armor